X-Wrt is a set of packages and patches to provide a web interface for the Linux distribution OpenWrt. It allows web based management of an OpenWrt device. It was originally created as a package for OpenWrt White Russian. At present it can be found in the OpenWrt trunk as the webif package. Some newer features such as dual-band support may not be present. On 31 October 2013, the X-Wrt homepage moved to Google Code.

Features
X-Wrt is an extension of OpenWrt for the end-user.

OpenWrt, prior to release 8.09, had a minimal web-management console, whereas X-Wrt is supplied with an enhanced web-management console, which has more than 40 control and status pages for a router.  has pages that include graphical traffic and system status monitoring, and pages for the control and status of the network, wireless, and security. Controls are provided for data logging, booting, cron, NVRAM, file editing, Linux package management, SNMP, backup and restore, firmware upgrade, WAN, VLAN, Wi-Fi, WEP, WPA, WDS, MAC filtering, firewall, port forwarding, DHCP, Dnsmasq, hostnames, IP control, routing, UPnP, QoS, DynDNS, WoL, OpenVPN, PPTP, and hotspots.

References

External links

 
 OpenWrt homepage
 Table of Hardware supported by OpenWrt

Custom firmware
Firewall software
Free routing software
Free security software
Free system software
Gateway/routing/firewall distribution
Linux security software